The Oregon Criminal Justice Commission (CJC) is a nine-member volunteer commission in the U.S. state of Oregon. It was established in 1995, charged with providing a "centralized and impartial forum for statewide policy development and planning" in order to "improve the efficiency and effectiveness of state and local criminal justice systems."

Like many other commissions, the CJC's members are appointed by the Governor of Oregon and approved by the Oregon State Senate. It was brought into existence by an act of the 1995 session of the Oregon Legislative Assembly, and its statutory authority is defined in Chapter 137 of the Oregon Revised Statutes.

See also 
 Oregon Department of Corrections
 Oregon Ballot Measure 11 (1994)

References

External links 
Oregon Criminal Justice Commission (official website)

Criminal Justice Commission
Oregon law
1995 establishments in Oregon